Malo Turčane is a village in the municipality of Gostivar, North Macedonia.

History
According to the 1467-68 Ottoman defter, Malo Turčane appears as being largely inhabited by an Orthodox Christian Albanian population. Due to Slavicisation, some families had a mixed Slav-Albanian anthroponomy - usually a Slavic first name and an Albanian last name or last names with Albanian patronyms and Slavic suffixes. 

The names are:Lazar Arbanas; Nikolla, son of Gjin; Rajk-o, his brother; Pop Nikolla; Rela, son of Gjin; Vlad-ko, son of Gjin; Nikolla, son of Gjin; Rajk-a, son of Nikolla; Dimitri, son of Nikolla; Ugrin Protogjer.

Demographics
As of the 2021 census, Vrutok had 96 residents with the following ethnic composition:
Albanians 85
Persons for whom data are taken from administrative sources 11

According to the 2002 census, the village had a total of 1,013 inhabitants. Ethnic groups in the village include:

Albanians 1,005
Macedonians 1
Others 7

References

External links

Villages in Gostivar Municipality
Albanian communities in North Macedonia